The 2019–20 season was Antalyaspor's 54th year in existence. In addition to the domestic league, Antalyaspor participated in the Turkish Cup.

Kits 

Supplier: Nike                                               
Main sponsor: Regnum Carya
Back sponsor: Anex Tour
Sleeve sponsor: Corendon Airlines
 Socks sponsor: 7 Mehmet

Players

First-team squad

Out on loan

Transfers

In

Out

Pre-season and friendlies

Pre-season

Mid-season

Competitions

Overview

Süper Lig

League table

Results summary

Updated: 24 July 2020

Results by round

Matches

Turkish Cup

Fourth round

Fifth round

Round of 16

Quarter-finals

Semi-finals

Statistics

Goalscorers

References
 

Antalyaspor seasons
Turkish football clubs 2019–20 season